Kasaragod district has four types of administrative hierarchies: 
 Taluk and Village administration managed by the provincial government of Kerala
 Panchayath Administration managed by the local bodies
 Parliament Constituencies for the federal government of India
 Assembly Constituencies for the provincial government of Kerala

Villages in Kasaragod District

Kasaragod Area
 Badiadka, Mogral Puthur, Madhur and Kumbadaje
 Bellur, Karadka, Chengala, Muliyar, Chemnad, Cheroor and Menangod. 
 Bedadka, Kuttikkol, Uduma and Pullur-Periya

Kanhangad Area

 Ajanur, Kodom-Bellur, Madikai, Kinanoor-Karinthalam and Ballal
 West Eleri, East Eleri, Kallar, Parappa and Panathadi

Nileshwar Area
 Nileshwar,Kinavoor, Kayyur-Cheemeni and Trikaripur
 Padanna, Valiyaparamba and Pilikkode

Manjeshwar Area
 Vorkadi, Meenja, Paivalike and Enmakaje
 Mangalpadi, Kumbla and Puthige

Kasaragod Parliament Constituency 
Kasaragod is a Lok Sabha constituency in Kerala.

Assembly segments
Kasaragod Lok Sabha constituency is composed of the following assembly segments:
Manjeshwaram
Kasaragod
Udma
Kanhangad
Thrikaripur
Payyanur
Kalliasseri

Members of Parliament
1957: A.K. Gopalan, Communist Party of India
1962: A.K. Gopalan, Communist Party of India
1967: A.K. Gopalan, Communist Party of India (Marxist)
1971: Ramachandran Kadannappalli, Indian National Congress
1977: Ramachandran Kadannappalli, Indian National Congress
1980: Ramanna Rai, Communist Party of India (Marxist)
1984: I. Rama Rai, Indian National Congress (I)
1989: Ramanna Rai, Communist Party of India (Marxist)
1991: Ramanna Rai, Communist Party of India (Marxist)
1996: T. Govindan, Communist Party of India (Marxist)
1998: T. Govindan, Communist Party of India (Marxist)
1999: T. Govindan, Communist Party of India (Marxist)
2004: P. Karunakaran, Communist Party of India (Marxist)
2009: P. Karunakaran, Communist Party of India (Marxist)
2014: P. Karunakaran, Communist Party of India (Marxist)

Indian general election, 2014
Left Democratic Front (LDF) has fielded sitting MP and veteran parliamentarian P. Karunakaran as the candidate in the Lok Sabha Elections 2014. T. Siddique was the United Democratic Front (UDF) candidate while K. Surendran was the Bharatiya Janata Party (BJP) candidate.

See also
 Indian general election, 2014 (Kerala)
 Kasaragod district
 List of Constituencies of the Lok Sabha

References

External links
 Election Commission of India: https://web.archive.org/web/20081218010942/http://www.eci.gov.in/StatisticalReports/ElectionStatistics.asp

Politics of Kasaragod district